Claud W. Beelman (1883 – January 30, 1963), sometimes known as Claude Beelman, was an American architect who designed many examples of Beaux-Arts, Art Deco, and Streamline Moderne style buildings.  Many of his buildings are listed on the National Register of Historic Places.

Biography

Beelman was married to Lourene Taft Beelman (b. 1883, Ohio - d. 1948, Ca.).  In 1910, he was  a draftsman in the state of Indiana.  (Cite:  U.S. Census Records, State of Indiana, 1910.)  It was there they had a daughter, Helen Beelman (b. 1912).  By the 1920s, the family had relocated to Los Angeles, and by 1930, they lived in Beverly Hills.

From the 1920s on, Beelman, as partner or owner of one or another of several firms (Curlett + Beelman; Allison & Allison; Ruck & Beelman; Claud Beelman & Associates) designed a number of prominent civic and private structures. By 1956, Claude Beelman & Associates officed at 7421 Beverly Blvd., Los Angeles 90036.

When he was in his seventies, Beelman designed the 12-story Superior Oil building  for oil tycoon W.M. Keck. Completed in 1955, the Superior Oil building later became  The Bank of California Building, and was used for the bank's offices until the 1980s.  By the late 1990s the building had been vacant for nearly ten years, but has been renovated beginning in 2000 by hotel developer Andre Balazs, and now is the location of his hotel The Standard.

It is the zig-zag moderne Eastern Columbia Building, however, with its facade of turquoise green terra cotta tile, ornate clock tower, art deco lighting, fixtures, signage and architectural detail that is Beelman's most recognizable work.  In 2006, the Eastern Columbia Building was converted from office space to loft live/work spaces by the Kor Group and is now one of the most desirable loft buildings in Downtown Los Angeles.

Works

Registered in The National Register of Historic Places
Some of the California landmark buildings designed by Beelman include (All located in Los Angeles, California unless otherwise noted):

Board of Trade Building, Downtown Los Angeles
Building at 816 South Grand Avenue, Downtown Los Angeles
Culver Hotel, Culver City, California
Cooper Arms Apartments, Long Beach
Eastern Columbia Building (Contributing structure in Broadway Theater and Commercial Historic District)
Garfield Building
Heinsbergen Decorating Company Building
Norwalk Memorial Hospital, 269 W. Main St. Norwalk, OH (Schriber & Beelman)
Pacific Electric Building, 610 S. Main St. Los Angeles 
Roosevelt Building, 727 W. Seventh St. Los Angeles 
Security Building, Phoenix, Arizona
Spring Street Realty Building (Contributing structure in Spring Street Historic District)
Superior Oil Company Building (now The Standard Downtown LA Hotel)
U.S. Post Office--Hollywood Station
Woodbury University, Wilshire Boulevard Building, Los Angeles

Other notable works

Barker Brothers Building
Central Plaza Building
Elks Lodge No. 99 / Park Plaza Hotel
Farmers and Merchants Bank Office Tower - Downtown Long Beach
Harbor Building at Crenshaw
Irving Thalberg Building, MGM (Sony) Studios
L.A. Jewelry Center
Mutual-Don Lee Broadcasting System studios (oldest surviving Hollywood studio built for television, now the Pickford Center for Motion Picture Study of the Academy of Motion Picture Arts and Sciences)
May Company Garage - 1926 - one of the Nation's first parking structures (Los Angeles Historic-Cultural Monument No. 1001)
Mercury Building
Pacific South West Trust Building
Rose Hill Housing Structure
Security Pacific Bank
The Talmadge

References

External links

"Services for Architect Claud Beelman Set", Los Angeles Times, February 2, 1963 Part II, page 6.

1883 births
1963 deaths
20th-century American architects
Art Deco architects
Streamline Moderne architects
Artists from Los Angeles
Architects from Ohio
Architects from California